Prairie Surf Studios (originally Myriad Convention Center and later Cox Convention Center) is a film production complex located in downtown Oklahoma City, Oklahoma. It was formerly a convention center and the home of several minor league teams.

History

The facility, known as the Myriad Convention Center, originally was the centerpiece of Oklahoma City's first major urban renewal project, the Pei Plan. In addition to the Convention Center, the project included the removal of blighted sections of the southern downtown area. The project also began the process for the design and construction of the Myriad Botanical Gardens, located directly west of the Myriad. As the Myriad, the facility received a major renovation and expansion. The US$55.8 million project was designed by Glover Bode. Flintco, who served as the renovation's general contractor, began construction in June 1997. The work was completed in August 1999.

It was later named Cox Convention Center via sponsorship with telecommunications company Cox Communications. The facility's primary use was that of large-scale convention and meeting space. It also hosted major concerts, conferences, and other large-scale events. The complex houses multiple meeting rooms, conference and convention space, dining halls, and a 15,000-seat multi-purpose arena.  When it opened in 1972, it replaced the Oklahoma State Fair Arena as Oklahoma City's main indoor sports and concert venue.  It would retain this status for 30 years until the opening of the Ford Center (now the Paycom Center) in 2002 directly across the street.

As the Cox Convention Center, the facility received another upgrade, budgeted at $4.5 million, to accommodate the Edmonton Oilers' top farm team, the Oklahoma City Barons, which began play in the 2010–11 season.

The arena was home to Oklahoma City Blazers hockey in the 1970s, another Blazers team from 1992 to 2002, the Bricktown Brawlers Indoor Football League team, the Oklahoma City Barons of the American Hockey League, and the Oklahoma City Blue of the NBA G League. The Oklahoma City Cavalry played in the Continental Basketball Association at the convention center from 1990 to 1997. It was also home to the Professional Rodeo Cowboys Association’s National Finals Rodeo from 1979 to 1984. The Cox Convention Center also hosted numerous state and college basketball events, including early rounds of the Men's NCAA basketball tournament and also the 2007 and 2009 Big 12 Women's Basketball Tournament and UFC Fight Night: Diaz vs. Guillard on September 16, 2009. The NCAA Men's Division I Indoor Track and Field Championships were held at the arena from 1986 to 1988.

Oklahoma City contracted with Prairie Surf Media to take over the convention center space for sound stages and production offices for their film company. On January 1, 2021, the building was renamed Prairie Surf Studios.

Events

Prior to the opening of the Ford Center, the Myriad was Oklahoma City's premier sports and entertainment venue.

WCW Thunder aired live from the Myriad Convention Center on February 12, 1998.  The event can be viewed on the WWE Network.

Concerts

Other events
National Finals Rodeo (1979–1984)
1983 Billy Graham Oklahoma Crusade at the arena
NBA and NHL exhibition games
1989 U.S. Olympic Festival events
Boxing
Tennis
UFC Fight Night: Diaz vs. Guillard – September 16, 2009
Indoor Track meets
American Bycycle Association: Grand Nationals
First and second-round games for the 1994 and 1998 NCAA Men's Division I Basketball Championship (Bryce Drew's famous buzzer beater took place here during the 1998 tournament)
Talk show host Phil Donahue taped his show in the Great Hall of the Myriad for a week in 1981
Pro Wrestling (Mid-South Wrestling, UWF, WWF and WCW)
OKC Oilfield Expo
It hosted the beatification of Stanley Rother on September 23, 2017, the first native-born American to be proclaimed a martyr of the Catholic Church.
North American Youth Congress 2015 overflow seating was provided at the convention center after selling out the neighboring Chesapeake Energy Arena.

References

External links
Prairie Surf Media official website

Athletics (track and field) venues in Oklahoma
Basketball venues in Oklahoma
Boxing venues in the United States
Buildings and structures in Oklahoma City
Convention centers in Oklahoma
Gymnastics venues in the United States
Indoor arenas in Oklahoma
Indoor track and field venues in the United States
Indoor ice hockey venues in the United States
Mixed martial arts venues in the United States
NBA G League venues
Sports venues in Oklahoma City
Oklahoma City Barons
Tourist attractions in Oklahoma City
Oklahoma City Blazers (1965–1977)
1972 establishments in Oklahoma
Sports venues completed in 1972